Chris Neville is a NASCAR pit road reporter who most recently worked for Fox Sports.  He is best known for his work with Fox, as well as formerly calling the Rolex Sports Car Series on SPEED, NASCAR Sprint Cup Series for NASCAR on TNT, and the IndyCar Series for NBC Sports.

Biography
Neville began racing go karts at 12 years old. He signed up for his first professional event when he was 18. Chris Neville attended Purdue University, where he graduated in 1995. Even while at Purdue, Neville continued to race. He then became an instructor at the Bob Bondurant School of High Performance Driving located in Phoenix, Arizona.

Racing career
In 1998, Neville signed up to race in the SCCA Trans-Am Series where he became Rookie of the Year. He continued to race in the Trans-Am Series until 2000, winning events such as the SPEED World Challenge.

Broadcasting career
In 2001, Neville decided to stop racing and became a pit road reporter for SPEED, bringing knowledge that came from his racing days. He has continued to work on television, moving to NASCAR on TNT and most recently to Fox NASCAR. On November 29, 2017 it was announced that Neville would not be returning as a Fox NASCAR Reporter in 2018.

Personal life
Chris Neville lives in Denver, Colorado with his wife and two daughters. He was elected to the Road Racing Drivers Club in 2011.

References

Living people
NASCAR people
1972 births
Motorsport announcers
Purdue University alumni
People from Scottsdale, Arizona
Trans-Am Series drivers